Lieutenant General Zia Ullah Khan (ضیاء اللہ خان) was a senior officer of the Pakistan Army who served as a corps commander of XII Corps from January 1993 – 1995 and commandant Azad Kashmir Regiment.  He had made various contributions in the military and civil development in Pakistan, especially in Balochistan for which he came to be highly respected in both circles. He was known for his service to urge Pervez Musharraf to step down after the 1999 Pakistani coup d'état.

He was awarded the Hilal-i-Imtiaz Military for the recognition of his services, which is the second-highest civilian award and honour given to both civilians and military officers of the Pakistan armed forces by the Government of Pakistan. It recognises individuals who have made an "especially meritorious contribution to the security or national interests of Pakistan, world peace, cultural or other significant public endeavors". 
He also served as the Mayo Hospital board of governors' chairman and Fauji Fertilizer Company Limited Managing Director.

Background 
He belonged to the ancestral village of the famous sufi poet Waris Shah of Jandiala Sher Khan. His father was Khan Moiz Ullah Khan, a renowned personality of the same village.

He was also the nephew of General Ghulam Jilani Khan.

References 

Pakistani generals
Year of birth missing
Recipients of Hilal-i-Imtiaz
Military awards and decorations of Pakistan
Baloch Regiment officers
2016 deaths